{{DISPLAYTITLE:C22H36O2}} 
The molecular formula C22H36O2 (molar mass: 332.52 g/mol, exact mass: 332.2715 u) may refer to: 

 Docosatetraenoic acid
 Ganaxolone
 Cannabicyclohexanol
 O-1656

Molecular formulas